The 2022 GCC Women's Gulf Cup was a women's T20I cricket (WT20I) tournament played in Oman from 20 to 26 March 2022. Organised by the Gulf Cooperation Council (GCC), the tournament featured the women's national teams of Oman, Bahrain, Kuwait, Qatar, Saudi Arabia and United Arab Emirates. Bahrain and Saudi Arabia played their first official WT20I matches during this tournament.

This was the fourth edition of the women's Gulf Cup, which had been contested annually between 2014 and 2016. The inaugural event in 2014 was hosted in Oman, was contested by Oman, UAE, Kuwait and Qatar, and was won by UAE who defeated Kuwait by 49 runs in the final. Qatar hosted the event in 2015, which saw UAE retain the title by defeating the hosts by five wickets in the final following a round-robin stage that also involved Oman. The 2016 edition was played at the Sharjah Cricket Stadium, and was contested by UAE, Oman, Kuwait, Qatar and guest teams from Kenya, Malaysia and Uganda. Kenya won the 2016 title with a five wicket win over UAE in the final.

On 22 March 2022, in the match between Bahrain and Saudi Arabia, Deepika Rasangika of Bahrain set a new record for the highest individual score in a WT20I match, scoring 161 not out.

Squads

Kuwait named Noora Bahurudeen and Reema Bahurudeen as reserves. Qatar included Manjiri Bawane, Sneha Chandnani, Fatima Saeed and Sharon Williams as reserves.

Points table

Fixtures

References

External links
 Series home at ESPN Cricinfo

2022 in women's cricket
Associate international cricket competitions in 2021–22
GCC Women's Gulf Cup